The 2022 NASCAR Camping World Truck Series was the 28th season of the NASCAR Camping World Truck Series, a stock car racing series sanctioned by NASCAR in the United States. The season started with the NextEra Energy 250 on February 18 at Daytona International Speedway, and concluded with the Lucas Oil 150 on November 4 at Phoenix Raceway. This was the final season of the Truck Series with Camping World as the title sponsor, as CEO Marcus Lemonis announced the brand would not return for the 2023 season. On August 26, 2022, it was announced that Craftsman would return as the Truck Series title sponsor, although the tool company is now owned by Stanley Black & Decker instead of Sears, who owned Craftsman when they were the series title sponsor from 1995 to 2008. This makes Stanley Black & Decker the series' third title sponsor.

Zane Smith of Front Row Motorsports clinched both the regular season championship and the Camping World Truck Series championship. Toyota won its 13th manufacturers' championship. Corey Heim of Kyle Busch Motorsports won the 2022 Camping World Truck Series Rookie of the Year honors.

Teams and drivers

Complete schedule

Limited schedule

Notes

Changes

Teams
 On April 30, 2021, Bill McAnally Racing West Series driver Cole Moore revealed that McAnally-Hilgemann Racing, the Truck Series team Bill McAnally co-owns, may expand to two teams full-time in 2022. On September 9, MHR announced that Colby Howard would drive full-time for the team in 2022 and it would most likely be in the team's new second truck. Howard previously drove the No. 15 for JD Motorsports in the Xfinity Series part-time in 2020 and full-time in 2021 until September, the Truck Series part-time in 2019 and 2021 for Young's Motorsports and CR7 Motorsports respectively, and the ARCA Menards Series in 2018 and 2019 for Mason Mitchell Motorsports and Win-Tron Racing respectively.
 On May 27, 2021, Tim Viens announced plans to field his own Truck Series team for the 2022 season, G2G Racing, after buying some Toyotas from Kyle Busch Motorsports. On February 3, 2022, the team announced that they would be fielding two full-time trucks, the Nos. 46 and 47. Matt Jaskol, who made his NASCAR debut in 2021 in the Xfinity Series with MBM Motorsports, would make his Truck Series debut and drive the No. 46 full-time while Viens, Johnny Sauter, Roger Reuse and other drivers would share the No. 47.
 On July 6, 2021, AM Racing team president Kevin Cywinski stated that his team would like to field a second truck (the No. 37) full-time, as it is part of their "long-term strategy". The team has run a second truck twice, the No. 32 at Daytona in 2017 with Austin Wayne Self driving (when J. J. Yeley drove Self's normal No. 22) and the No. 37 at Knoxville in 2021 with Brett Moffitt driving. On March 21, 2022, AM Racing confirmed that it would field a second part-time truck, the No. 37, starting with Logan Bearden in the race at COTA. The truck will be driven by other drivers in other races later in the season. On May 26, it was announced that Max Gutiérrez would drive the truck part-time in a collaboration with Rette Jones Racing starting at Charlotte.
 On November 23, 2021, Cup Series team Spire Motorsports announced plans to expand to the Truck Series in 2022. At the time, the team had yet to determine if they would field their one truck full-time or part-time and who their driver(s) would be. The team would field the No. 7 truck part-time with Austin Hill driving it at Daytona, Alex Bowman driving it at COTA, and William Byron driving it to the race win at Martinsville.
 On November 28, 2021, former ARCA Menards Series team owner Roger Carter posted on Facebook that he and Mike Affarano would be jointly fielding a truck at Martinsville and Bristol. The legitimacy of the entry and whether it will make it to the track has been questioned by social media users given Carter's numerous past legal issues as well as issues surrounding Affarano's team in the past, including how the team had to withdraw from last race they attempted, in 2020 at Homestead, due to outdated equipment. The truck that Affarano and Carter purchased was last used by NTS Motorsports, a team that closed down in 2016. The team's driver(s), number, crew chief and sponsor(s) have all yet to be announced. The team did not end up entering the race at Martinsville.
 On December 1, 2021, Hattori Racing Enterprises announced that they would expand to a two-truck operation in 2022, with the No. 61, driven by Chase Purdy, as its new second full-time truck.
 On December 2, 2021, David Gilliland revealed in an interview with Dustin Albino from Jayski that his David Gilliland Racing team would field three full-time trucks in 2022. The No. 17, which was previously a part-time truck, will now be fielded full-time with Taylor Gray continuing to drive part-time along with other drivers sharing the ride with him.
 On December 6, 2021, Hill Motorsports announced that they would expand to a two-truck operation in 2022. The second truck will be fielded full-time with multiple drivers sharing the ride. The drivers, the number and the crew chief of the second truck have not been announced yet.
 On December 7, 2021, it was announced that GMS Racing would be downsizing from 5 full-time trucks to 2 in 2022 as a result of the team expanding into the Cup Series through their acquisition of the majority of Richard Petty Motorsports. The trucks that were closed down are the Nos. 2, 21 and 26. The drivers of those trucks in 2021 (Sheldon Creed, Zane Smith and Tyler Ankrum, respectively) all left the team. The team sold the 2021 owner points from those trucks to GMS-affiliated teams, with the Reaume Brothers Racing Nos. 33 and 43 trucks getting the owner points from the GMS Nos. 23 and 24 trucks and the new McAnally-Hilgemann Racing No. 91 truck getting the owner points from the closed GMS No. 26 truck. GMS transferred the owner points from the Nos. 2 and 21 trucks (which were closed down) to their Nos. 23 and 24 trucks.
 On December 23, 2021, CR7 Motorsports announced that their No. 9 truck would run the full season with Blaine Perkins driving. Although the No. 9 truck ran almost all the races in 2020 and 2021, 2022 will mark the first season it has been fielded full-time. On February 10, CR7 announced that they would field a second truck, the No. 97, part-time in 2022 with their ARCA driver Jason Kitzmiller attempting to qualify for the season-opener at Daytona.
 On March 8, 2022, Team Stange Racing announced that they would debut in the Truck Series, fielding an entry in the race at Sonoma for Tarso Marques in order for him to be approved to make his debut in the Cup Series at Road America with the team, which would run part-time in the Cup Series with him. However, TSR did not end up entering the race and announced they would instead field an entry for Marques in the Xfinity Series race at the Indianapolis Road Course for him to be approved to race in the Cup Series (which also did not end up happening).
 On April 15, 2022, NASCAR notified G2G Racing that the chassis for their No. 46 truck for the Bristol dirt race was registered to CMI Motorsports (who G2G had purchased the truck from). As a result, G2G owner Tim Viens had to withdraw the No. 46 truck, which was to be driven by Andrew Gordon, from the race. Viens then phone called CMI owner Ray Ciccarelli who agreed to file a late entry and field the No. 49 truck for Gordon in the race.

Drivers
 On June 12, 2021, Reaume Brothers Racing stated that Lawless Alan could run a full season for their team in 2022. He drove part-time for RBR and Niece Motorsports in 2021. On November 4, Niece Motorsports announced that Alan would drive the No. 45 full-time in 2022.
 On July 16, 2021, 2020 Truck Series champion Sheldon Creed stated in an interview that he would like to move up to the Xfinity Series full-time in 2022. He has driven full-time for GMS Racing in the No. 2 full-time since 2019. On September 14, it was announced that Creed would drive full-time for Richard Childress Racing in the Xfinity Series in 2022.
 On August 8, 2021, Matt DiBenedetto, who lost his full-time Cup Series ride with the Wood Brothers to Harrison Burton for 2022, stated in an interview that he would "entertain anything" when it comes to his 2022 plans, which means that he was open to moving down to the Xfinity or Truck Series full-time. On January 6, 2022, Rackley WAR announced that DiBenedetto would drive their No. 25 truck full-time in 2022.
 On August 26, 2021, it was announced that Jack Wood, who drove most of the season in the GMS Racing No. 24 truck in 2021 after the team released Raphaël Lessard during the season due to lack of funding, would return to the team in 2022 to run full-time in the No. 24 truck.
 On September 2, 2021, Jerry Freeze, the general manager of Front Row Motorsports, stated in an interview with Dave Moody on SiriusXM NASCAR Radio that the team was considering starting an Xfinity Series team in 2022 and if they do so, Todd Gilliland, FRM's Truck Series driver, could move up to that series and drive that car full-time. Anthony Alfredo, one of FRM's Cup Series drivers who was rumored to lose his Cup Series ride as a result of FRM being rumored to close down his No. 38 car and sell the car's charter to 23XI Racing (which fell through), was rumored as Gilliland's replacement in the FRM No. 38 truck or for the FRM Xfinity Series car with Gilliland remaining in the Truck Series. However, the team confirmed on November 9 that Alfredo would not be driving for them in 2022 regardless of series. On November 30, FRM announced that Gilliland would move up to the Cup Series for the team in their No. 38 car while Zane Smith would leave GMS Racing to replace Gilliland in the No. 38 truck in 2022.
 On September 18, 2021, Marcus Lemonis, the CEO of series title sponsor Camping World, tweeted that he would like to see two-time Truck Series champion and NASCAR on Fox analyst Todd Bodine return to the series to run six races in order to reach 800 starts in NASCAR's top three series. If 800 fans tweeted their approval, Lemonis and Camping World would sponsor him in these six races. The goal was reached on October 1, making the deal official. On December 13, it was announced that Bodine would run his six races in a second truck for Stewart Friesen's Halmar Friesen Racing team. The team fielded a second truck, the No. 62, for Stewart's wife Jessica Friesen in the two dirt races in 2021. On February 16, Bodine revealed in a tweet that the No. 62 will also be his number.
 On October 1, 2021, GMS Racing announced that Grant Enfinger would drive their No. 23 truck full-time in 2022 and 2023, replacing Chase Purdy. He returns to the team after previously driving for them in ARCA in 2014 and 2015, where he won the 2015 championship. He also drove part-time for GMS in the Truck Series in 2016 where he won at Talladega. Enfinger drove the No. 98 for ThorSport Racing full-time from 2017 to 2020 and part-time in that truck and the No. 9 for CR7 Motorsports in 2021. On November 30, it was announced that Purdy would driving a new second full-time truck for Hattori Racing Enterprises, the No. 61.
 On October 2, 2021, Jamie Little revealed during the NASCAR on Fox pre-race show for the race at Talladega that Austin Hill will not be returning to Hattori Racing Enterprises in 2022. On October 29, it was announced that Hill would drive full-time for Richard Childress Racing in the Xfinity Series in 2022. On December 1, 2021, HRE announced that Tyler Ankrum would move over from the GMS Racing No. 26 truck to replace Hill in the No. 16 in 2022.
 On October 2, 2021, the MAVTV broadcasters calling the ARCA Menards Series race at Salem mentioned that Corey Heim would run full-time in the Truck Series in 2022 although Heim's 2022 plans had yet to be announced. On December 21, it was announced that Heim would run the majority of the season (15 races) in the No. 51 for Kyle Busch Motorsports. He drove full-time in the main ARCA Series for Venturini Motorsports and part-time in the Truck Series (3 races) for KBM in 2021.
 On November 2, 2021, Niece Motorsports announced that Dean Thompson would drive full-time for the team in the Truck Series in 2022. He drove the team's No. 44 truck in the 2021 season-finale at Phoenix as well as their No. 40 car in the ARCA Menards Series season-finale at Kansas. After Kris Wright was announced to drive the No. 44, Thompson drove the No. 40 truck, replacing Ryan Truex.
 On November 30, 2021, On Point Motorsports announced that Tate Fogleman would drive the team's No. 30 truck full-time in 2022. He drove the No. 12 for Young's Motorsports full-time in 2021 and scored an upset win at Talladega. On June 8, 2022, it  was announced that Colin Garrett would drive the No. 30 truck at Sonoma instead of Fogleman. However, on June 10, Garrett had to be replaced due to his drug test results not coming in in time for practice. (As it was his first start of the season, he had to take a drug test beforehand.) Josh Bilicki drove the No. 30 truck in qualifying and the race. Joey Gase would be in the 30 car at Knoxville, instead of his planned No. 31 car. Camden Murphy, who last competed for NEMCO Motorsports and Spencer Davis Motorsports, drove the car at Nashville. Kaden Honeycutt, who drove for G2G Racing earlier this year, would attempt 3 races for the team. Chris Hacker would return to the team at IRP.
 On December 1, 2021, Niece Motorsports announced that the winner of the 2021 Castrol Gateway Dirt Nationals Super Late Model race on December 4 would drive one of the team's trucks at Knoxville. Tyler Carpenter won the race that night, giving him the opportunity to drive for Niece in the Truck Series. With Niece having announced four full-time drivers for 2022, Carpenter would drive a fifth part-time truck for the team. On March 3, 2022, Niece announced that the number of their part-time fifth truck would be the No. 41 and that it would be fielded part-time for Ross Chastain in select races beginning at Atlanta, which was the first time the team fielded five trucks in a race. On July 1, the team announced that Justin Marks, the owner of the Cup Series team Trackhouse, would come out of his NASCAR driving retirement to drive the No. 41 at Mid-Ohio.
 On December 7, 2021, Niece Motorsports announced that Kris Wright would drive the No. 44 in 2022. Wright previously drove the No. 02 for Young's Motorsports part-time in 2021. On August 9, 2022, Wright parted ways with Niece Motorsports, with Chad Chastain replacing him at Richmond.
 On December 22, 2021, Young's Motorsports announced that Jesse Little would run at least 12 races for the team with the possibility of more races being added. He previously drove the No. 78 for B. J. McLeod Motorsports in the Xfinity Series for most of the 2021 season.
 On December 23, 2021, CR7 Motorsports announced that Blaine Perkins would drive their No. 9 truck full-time in 2022. Perkins drove the No. 23 car for Our Motorsports in the Xfinity Series part-time in 2021. This will be his debut in the Truck Series.
 On February 3, 2022, it was announced that Matt Jaskol would drive full-time for G2G Racing in their new No. 46 truck in 2022. Jaskol made his NASCAR debut in 2021 driving part-time for MBM Motorsports in the Xfinity Series. On April 7, Jaskol revealed in a tweet that he had parted ways with G2G. Prior to the Martinsville race, G2G suspended Jaskol's contract due to a disagreement between the team and Jaskol's sponsor AutoParts4Less.com.
 On March 22, 2022, AM Racing announced that Logan Bearden would attempt to make his Truck Series debut at COTA in their part-time No. 37 truck at COTA. He failed to qualify for the same race in 2021 for Niece Motorsports in the No. 44 truck. On May 26, the team announced that ARCA and NASCAR Mexico Series driver Max Gutiérrez would make his Truck Series debut in the No. 37 truck at Charlotte in a collaboration with his ARCA team, Rette Jones Racing, and would run additional races later in the season. The two teams collaborated to field the No. 32 car for Gutiérrez in the main ARCA Series season-opener at Daytona.
 On March 26, 2022, Cup Series driver Joey Logano announced he would be driving a truck in the Pinty's Dirt Truck Race at Bristol. On that same day, Bob Pockrass from Fox reported that he saw Logano enter a David Gilliland Racing hauler. He would drive the No. 54 in the race.
 On April 6, 2022, it was announced that William Byron would drive the Spire Motorsports No. 7 truck at Martinsville.
 On May 30, 2022, it was announced that late model racing driver Mason Maggio would make his Truck Series debut for Reaume Brothers Racing in the No. 33 truck in the race at Gateway. Maggio drove for RBR again at Richmond after failing to qualify for the race in the Peck Motorsports No. 96 truck. He replaced team owner Josh Reaume, who did qualify for the race, in the No. 43 truck after Reaume suffered a back injury while working in the team's race shop earlier in the week.
 On June 4, 2022, G2G Racing owner Tim Viens revealed to Mark Kristl from Frontstretch that Mason Filippi and Travis McCullough would both attempt to make their Truck Series debuts at Sonoma in the team's Nos. 46 and 47 trucks, respectively. However, on June 10, McCullough had to be replaced due to his drug test results not coming in in time for practice. (As it was his first start of the season, he had to take a drug test beforehand.) Stefan Parsons was going to replace him in the No. 47 truck for qualifying. However, on June 11, Parsons moved from the No. 47 to replace Filippi in the No. 46 truck in qualifying due to Filippi not adjusting to the truck well enough in practice. The No. 47 truck was withdrawn. Filippi ended up making his debut at Mid-Ohio.
 On June 7, 2022, AM Racing announced that Austin Wayne Self's wife Jennifer was expecting a baby during the Sonoma race weekend and he would not be running the race. Instead of having someone fill in for him, the team opted to withdraw the No. 22 truck and not run the race at all. Brett Moffitt replaced him at Knoxville, and Gutiérrez would opt up at Nashville and Pocono.

Crew chiefs
 On November 5, 2021, Truck Series play-by-play announcer Vince Welch from Fox reported during the broadcast of the 2021 season-finale at Phoenix that Carl Joiner Jr. (Junior Joiner) would retire from crew chiefing in NASCAR in 2022 and return to California. He was Matt Crafton's crew chief at ThorSport Racing for 10 years and won three championships with him. On February 3, 2022, ThorSport announced that Jeff Hensley, who was previously a crew chief for the team from 2014 to 2015 and again from 2017 to 2020, would return for a third stint with the team and would be Crafton's new crew chief.
 On November 11, 2021, David Gilliland Racing announced that Jerry Baxter would be the new crew chief for their No. 15 truck driven by Tanner Gray in 2022. Baxter was previously was the crew chief for the No. 43 Richard Petty Motorsports Cup Series car in 2020 with Bubba Wallace and in 2021 with Erik Jones. Tanner Gray and the No. 15 truck had six different crew chiefs in 2021 (Shane Wilson, Seth Smith, Jacob Hampton, Marcus Richmond, Chad Johnston and Wes Ward). On August 9, 2022, DGR announced a crew chief swap starting at Richmond, with Baxter moving from the No. 15 to the No. 1 driven by Hailie Deegan and Mike Hillman Jr. moving from the No. 1 to the No. 15.
 On November 23, 2021, it was announced that Kevin Manion, who was the crew chief for the No. 21 truck for GMS Racing and Zane Smith in 2020 and 2021, would be leaving for Spire Motorsports to be the crew chief for their new truck.
 On December 16, 2021, it was announced that Jeff Hensley and Chad Walter, who were the crew chiefs for the Nos. 23 and 24 trucks for GMS Racing in 2022, would both be leaving to crew chief for Our Motorsports in the Xfinity Series in 2022. However, on February 3, 2022, it was announced that Hensley would instead go to ThorSport Racing to be the new crew chief for Matt Crafton's No. 88 truck. On January 25, 2022, GMS announced that Charles Denike and Tom Ackerman would be the new crew chiefs of their Nos. 23 and 24 trucks.
 On December 22, 2021, Hattori Racing Enterprises announced that Matt Lucas would be the crew chief for the team's new second truck, the No. 61, driven by Chase Purdy. He will also be the Team Manager for HRE. Lucas was previously the shop manager for Joe Gibbs Racing's Xfinity Series teams and has also served as crew chief in the Xfinity Series for JGR, SunEnergy1 Racing, RAB Racing, TriStar Motorsports and XCI Racing.
 On June 29, 2022, it was announced that Jeff Hensley, who started the season as the new crew chief for Matt Crafton and the No. 88 ThorSport Racing truck, would be going back to the GMS Racing No. 23 truck which he crew chiefed in 2021. He would replace Charles Denike as the crew chief for Grant Enfinger for the rest of 2022. Hensley crew chiefed Enfinger in the ThorSport No. 98 truck from 2017 to 2020. On July 2, it was announced that Denike would go to the GMS-aligned McAnally-Hilgemann Racing to be the crew chief for the No. 19 truck of Derek Kraus, replacing Shane Wilson. Wilson would become the crew chief of the Bassett Racing No. 77 car in the Xfinity Series and then became Crafton's new crew chief beginning at Richmond.

Interim crew chiefs
 On March 24, 2022, NASCAR indefinitely suspended Young's Motorsports No. 02 truck crew chief Eddie Troconis after he was re-arrested on March 18 as a result of his assault charge (which came after he fought and injured spotter Clayton Hughes during the 2021 Chevrolet Silverado 250 race weekend at Talladega Superspeedway) being re-instated by a grand jury in Alabama. (Troconis was suspended for the last two races of 2021 but reinstated before the 2022 season after the charges were dropped by a prosecutor in February.) Steven Dawson has served as the interim crew chief for the No. 02 truck, driven by Jesse Little and Kaz Grala, since Tronconis' suspension started.
 On June 24, 2022, McAnally-Hilgemann Racing No. 19 truck crew chief Shane Wilson was suspended for that day's race at Nashville due to an improperly installed ballast. It is unclear who filled in for Wilson as Derek Kraus' interim crew chief in the race.
 On October 5, 2022, NASCAR indefinitely suspended Young's Motorsports No. 20 truck crew chief Andrew Abbott after he violated the behavioral policy in the NASCAR rulebook. The team has yet to announce an interim crew chief.

Manufacturers
 On September 23, 2021, NASCAR announced that the trucks of each manufacturer would have new body updates to their noses and tails that would more closely resemble the street versions of those trucks. Ford unveiled their new body update on the same day and Toyota unveiled theirs on the next day. Chevrolet unveiled their new body update on October 29.
 On October 13, 2021, it was announced that McAnally-Hilgemann Racing would be switching to Chevrolet and would have an alliance with GMS Racing in 2022. They previously were a Toyota team and had an alliance with Hattori Racing Enterprises.
 On December 6, 2021, Hill Motorsports announced that they would be switching from Chevrolet to Toyota in 2022.
 On December 23, 2021, it was announced that CR7 Motorsports would have a technical alliance with GMS Racing in 2022.

Sponsorship
 On October 1, 2021, it was announced that Champion Power Equipment would move with Grant Enfinger from ThorSport Racing and CR7 Motorsports to GMS Racing in 2022 and return in 2023 and would sponsor his No. 23 truck for the majority of both years.
 On November 30, 2021, it was announced that BAMA Buggies would move with Chase Purdy from GMS Racing to Hattori Racing Enterprises in 2022 and would sponsor his No. 61 truck for the majority of the season.
 On December 1, 2021, it was announced that the Laborers' International Union of North America (LIUNA) would move with Tyler Ankrum from GMS Racing to Hattori Racing Enterprises and would sponsor his No. 16 truck for the majority of the season.
 On January 20, 2022, Young's Motorsports would announce that men's grooming brand Derm Dude would sponsor Spencer Boyd for three races in 2022.

Potential and rumored changes

Teams
 On October 20, 2021, Greg Van Alst revealed that he is looking to expand his team, which he fields in the ARCA Menards Series, into the Truck Series part-time in 2022. If this happens, Van Alst himself will be the driver and it would be his debut in the series. However, van Alst did not attempt a Truck race in 2022.

Rule changes
 On November 19, 2021, NASCAR announced the new practice and qualifying formats across all three national series in 2022. The formats are as follows:
 Paved oval races: After a 20-minute practice period, all trucks will run a single qualifying lap (two laps at Martinsville, Bristol, Richmond, and Dover).
 Daytona and Talladega: All trucks run one lap each, with the top 10 transferring to the final round.
 Road courses: After a 20-minute practice period, the field will be separated into two groups, each running a 15-minute timed session. The top five of each group will advance to the final round, which consists of a 10-minute timed session.
 Dirt tracks: Four qualifying races will determine the starting lineup.
 Daytona, Atlanta, Bristol dirt, Knoxville, Sonoma, Mid-Ohio, Nashville, and the Phoenix season ending race will have one 50-minute practice session.
 On March 11, 2022, NASCAR announced that the reconfigured Atlanta Motor Speedway will enforce track limits, currently implemented on Daytona International Speedway and Talladega Superspeedway.  
 The race at Gateway will no longer utilize special restrictions on pit lane, as it will be held jointly with the Cup Series race at the circuit. Pit restrictions will be implemented at Mid-Ohio, a standalone race, and dirt pit restrictions will be in effect at both dirt races.

Schedule

The 2022 season schedule was announced on September 29, 2021.

Note: The Triple Truck Challenge races (the first race at World Wide Technology Raceway and races at Nashville and Mid-Ohio) are listed in bold.

Schedule changes

There is one more race on the schedule, as it now contains 23 races instead of 22 from 2021.

 After a 23-year absence, Sonoma returns to the schedule for the first time since 1998 and after a 10-year absence, Lucas Oil Indianapolis Raceway Park also returned to the schedule, becoming a playoff race.
 Mid-Ohio earned a Truck Series race and will host the Truck Series for the first time in series history, after losing their date in Xfinity Series. Kansas also earned a 2nd date permanently, in the playoff, after being added in 2020 as a replacement due to COVID-19 pandemic.
 Homestead Miami returned to the schedule after being removed due to logistical reasons in 2021 after the Auto Club Speedway Cup and Xfinity races were canceled because of state restrictions.
 The two pandemic-related changes midway through the season, the second Daytona International Speedway (road course) and Darlington Raceway (playoff) races, which were added because of pandemic-related restrictions, were removed.  NASCAR permanently removed the Canadian Tire Motorsport Park event that had been replaced by Darlington each of the past two seasons.
 Watkins Glen and the 2nd Las Vegas (the playoff one) races were also removed from the schedule permanently.
 As for other slight realignments, Martinsville will go from the fall to the spring date and Richmond will go from the spring to the summer date.

Results and standings

Race results

Drivers' championship

(key) Bold – Pole position awarded by time. Italics – Pole position set by final practice results or owner's points. * – Most laps led. 1 – Stage 1 winner. 2 – Stage 2 winner.  1-10 – Regular season top 10 finishers.
. – Eliminated after Round of 10
. – Eliminated after Round of 8

Owners' championship (Top 15)
(key) Bold – Pole position awarded by time. Italics – Pole position set by final practice results or owner's points. * – Most laps led. 1 – Stage 1 winner. 2 – Stage 2 winner. 1-10 – Regular season top 10 finishers.
. – Eliminated after Round of 10
. – Eliminated after Round of 8

Manufacturers' championship

See also
 2022 NASCAR Cup Series
 2022 NASCAR Xfinity Series
 2022 ARCA Menards Series
 2022 ARCA Menards Series East
 2022 ARCA Menards Series West
 2022 NASCAR Whelen Modified Tour
 2022 NASCAR Pinty's Series
 2022 NASCAR Mexico Series
 2022 NASCAR Whelen Euro Series
 2022 SRX Series

References

NASCAR Truck
NASCAR Truck